Im Heung-soon (born in South Korea 1969) is an artist and director who won the Silver Lion award at the 2015 Venice Biennale for his video work, Factory Complex.

His political yet emotional works are embodied through different visual mediums such as photography, installations, public art, community art, and films.

Selected exhibitions 

 57th Carnegie International, 2018
 "Kaesong Industrial Complex", Culture Station Seoul, 2018
 "Reincarnation", MoMA PS1, 2015

References

Further reading 

 

1969 births
21st-century South Korean male artists
Living people
South Korean filmmakers